Stewart Bridge is a Howe truss covered bridge built in 1930 near Walden, Oregon, United States, in Lane County. It was listed on the National Register of Historic Places in 1979.

See also 
 List of bridges on the National Register of Historic Places in Oregon
 List of Oregon covered bridges

References 

Bridges completed in 1930
National Register of Historic Places in Lane County, Oregon
Covered bridges in Lane County, Oregon
1930 establishments in Oregon
Covered bridges on the National Register of Historic Places in Oregon
Road bridges on the National Register of Historic Places in Oregon
Wooden bridges in Oregon
Howe truss bridges in the United States